The palatine raphe (or median raphe or median palatine raphe) is a raphe running across the palate, from the palatine uvula to the incisive papilla.

External links
 
 Diagram at bris.ac.uk
 Diagram at ana.bris.ac.uk
 Diagram at waybuilder.net

Mouth